David Kahn (born July 28, 1961) is an American sports executive, attorney, and former sportswriter. He is the former president of basketball operations for the Minnesota Timberwolves of the National Basketball Association. Of most note, in the 2009 NBA draft, he twice passed on drafting Stephen Curry, instead choosing 2 other point guards (Ricky Rubio at #5 and then Jonny Flynn at #6).

Early life and career
Kahn was born to a Jewish family in Portland, Oregon with three siblings Robert Kahn, now living in Jerusalem, Steven Kahn, a personal injury lawyer in Portland, and Sarah Kahn Glass. His father, Garry L. Kahn, was the founder of personal injury firm Kahn & Kahn which his brother now runs.

He attended Woodrow Wilson High School (Portland, Oregon) before matriculating to UCLA, where he graduated with a degree in English in 1983. While at UCLA, he was sports editor for the Daily Bruin for two years and a Los Angeles Times intern.  Upon his graduation, he returned to his hometown of Portland and worked as a sportswriter for The Oregonian from 1983 through 1989, where he covered the local and national sports scene, including the NBA's Portland Trail Blazers.

After leaving the Oregonian, Kahn received his J.D. degree from NYU and worked with Proskauer Rose, the same law firm that represents the big four North American sports leagues (NFL, NBA, MLB, and NHL) in many of their legal matters, for several years.

Basketball career

National Basketball Association
Kahn was hired by the Indiana Pacers of the National Basketball Association (NBA) in 1995, remaining with the organization until 2004, working mostly on the business side of the franchise.  After his tenure with the Pacers, Kahn returned to Portland and spearheaded an effort to lure the Montreal Expos or another major-league team to Portland; the Expos ultimately relocated to Washington, D.C., and became the Nationals. Kahn's attempts to bring Major League Baseball to Portland were unsuccessful. Kahn was also involved in real estate ventures in the Portland area.  In 2005, he purchased several teams in the NBA D-League.

2009 NBA Draft

On May 22, 2009, Kahn was hired by the Minnesota Timberwolves as president of basketball operations to replace Kevin McHale. In the 2009 NBA Draft Minnesota held the #5 and #6 picks. Kahn selected point guard Ricky Rubio at #5 and then Jonny Flynn at #6, thus twice passing on selecting on Stephen Curry, who was selected by the Golden State Warriors at #7.  Although Rubio would go on to have a long NBA career, Flynn would only play for 2 seasons in the NBA.  Curry (as of 2022) would go on to become a multiple time All-Star, All NBA, FMVP, MVP, all time 3 point leader, as well as league champion. For his part Kahn has little to say about passing on drafting Curry. When asked in 2019 Kahn deflected, noting that many other teams had also passed on Curry 

Curry himself (in 2018 on the Ringer   and 2022 on Draymond Green's Podcast ) relayed the rumor that his love of golf and Minnesota's inclement weather was a reason for Kahn / Minnesota passing on selecting him.

Kahn also drafted multiple players that are considered busts, such as Wesley Johnson, and Derrick Williams. Echoing comments made by some columnists after Kahn made several controversial moves in the summer of 2010, ESPN writers Chad Ford and John Hollinger called his tenure "baffling" to them.

On May 2, 2013, Kahn was released from the Timberwolves after they did not exercise their option on his contract, instead hiring Flip Saunders for a second stint with the team.

France
On July 12, 2018, Kahn was announced as the president of Paris Basketball in the LNB Pro B

References

1961 births
Writers from Portland, Oregon
University of California, Los Angeles alumni
Living people
National Basketball Association executives
National Basketball Association general managers
Minnesota Timberwolves executives
The Oregonian people
Jewish men's basketball players
American sports journalists
Proskauer Rose people